The Gorham Savings Bank Maine Marathon, formerly known as the Casco Bay Marathon, is a series of USATF-certified road running events held each October in Portland, Maine that includes a full marathon, a half marathon, and a marathon relay. The course is an out-and-back that starts and finishes along the Back Cove of Portland, going up the coast to Yarmouth and back.

History 

From 1978 through 1987, the event was known as the Casco Bay Marathon.

The 2012 race was held on Sept. 30, and the 2013 event was held on Oct. 6.

The 2020 in-person edition of the race was cancelled due to the coronavirus pandemic, with all registrants given the option of running the race virtually (and obtaining a partial refund), transferring their entry to 2021, or obtaining a full refund.

Winners

External links
Official website
Maine Marathon - Association of Road Racing Statisticians
Maine Marathon - marathonguide.com

References

Marathons in the United States
Half marathons in the United States
Sports in Portland, Maine
1992 establishments in Maine
Annual sporting events in the United States